is a passenger railway station located in the city of Yonago, Tottori Prefecture, Japan.  It is operated by the West Japan Railway Company (JR West). It is also a freight depot for the Japan Freight Railway Company (JR Freight).

Lines
All trains on the Hakubi Line continue past this station to Yonago Station via the San'in Main Line tracks. Some limited express 'Yakumo' trains on the Hakubi Line and some limited express 'Super Matsukaze' trains on the San'in Main Line stop here (only inbound trains in the morning and outbound trains in the evening). Other limited express trains pass. All Rapid Tottori Liners stop here.

Station layout
The station consists of one ground-level side platform and one ground-level  island platform. The station buildings adjacent to the side platform and connected with the island platform by a footbridge. The station building is staffed.

Platforms

History
It was renamed  on October 10, 1911 and to its present name on May 1, 1917. The current station building was completed in 1981. With the privatization of the Japan National Railways (JNR) on April 1, 1987, the station came under the aegis of the West Japan Railway Company.

Passenger statistics
In fiscal 2018, the station was used by an average of 1500 passengers daily.

Surrounding area
 Oji Paper Yonago Mill
Yonago Shoin High School
 Minokaya Junior High School, Hiyoshi Tsumura Junior High School

See also
List of railway stations in Japan

References

External links 

  Hōki-Daisen Station from JR-Odekake.net 

Railway stations in Tottori Prefecture
Stations of West Japan Railway Company
Stations of Japan Freight Railway Company
Hakubi Line
Sanin Main Line
Railway stations in Japan opened in 1902
Yonago, Tottori